Punta de Maisi Airport  is an airport serving the town of Maisí in the Guantánamo Province of Cuba.

See also

Transport in Cuba
List of airports in Cuba

References

External links
OpenStreetMap - Punta de Maisi
OurAirports - Punta de Maisi
Bing Maps - Punta de Maisi
Google Maps - Punta de Maisi

Airports in Cuba